Tu Inspiración is the eleventh album by Alacranes Musical. It was released on August 26, 2008.

Track listing
Dame Tu Amor
Perdidamente Enamorado
Fue Su Amor
Mirame Amor
Soy Yo
Mi Otra Mitad
Te Sigue Esperando Mi Corazon
El Duranguense
Esperando Por Ti
Adios Amor
La Historia De Siempre
Esther

Charts

Weekly charts

Year-end charts

Sales and certifications

References

2008 albums
Alacranes Musical albums
Spanish-language albums
Latin Grammy Award for Best Banda Album